Dabi is a village in Bundi district, Rajasthan, India. At the 2011 census the village had a population of 9,818.

References

Villages in Bundi district